Phaestus or Phaestos or Phaistos was a town of ancient Thessaly in the district Pelasgiotis, a little to the right of the Peneius. It was taken by the Roman praetor Marcus Baebius Tamphilus in 191 BCE.

References

Populated places in ancient Thessaly
Former populated places in Greece
Lost ancient cities and towns
Pelasgiotis